Football was contested for men only at the 1950 Central American and Caribbean Games in Guatemala City, Guatemala.

The gold medal was won by Curaçao who earned 4 points in the final round.

Participating teams

While only the federation of Curaçao (C.V.B.) were FIFA members at the time (the Dutch Antilles federation N.A.V.U. was not founded until 1958), the team entering here was a Dutch Antilles selection representing the N.A.O.C., the olympic committee of the territory.

Venue

Controversy
Costa Rica withdrew from the Games after a pitch invasion by the spectators at the end of their match against Dutch Antilles, following a brawl between players caused by a collision between Costa Rica player Calleta Molina and Dutch Antilles keeper Ergilio Hato; when the pitch was cleared, Dutch Antilles again took the field but Costa Rica refused to continue.

First round

Group A

Group B

Final round playoff
Guatemala and Mexico finished level on points, so a play-off had to be played to decide who would qualify to the final round

Final round playoff replay

Final round playoff second replay

Final round

Statistics

Goalscorers

References

External links
 

1950 Central American and Caribbean Games
1950